Alison Barros Moraes (born 30 June 1982) is a Brazilian football player.

Club statistics

References

External links

Omiya Ardija
Guardian's Stats Centre

1982 births
Living people
Brazilian footballers
Brazilian expatriate footballers
Brazilian expatriate sportspeople in South Korea
Expatriate footballers in South Korea
Brazilian expatriate sportspeople in Japan
Expatriate footballers in Japan
Ulsan Hyundai FC players
Daejeon Hana Citizen FC players
Marília Atlético Clube players
Omiya Ardija players
K League 1 players
J1 League players
Association football forwards